60 metres, or 60-meter dash, is a sprint event in track and field. It is a championship event for indoor championships, normally dominated by the best outdoor 100 metres runners. At indoor events, the 60 metres is run on lanes set out in the middle of the 'field', as is the hurdles event over the same distance, thus avoiding some of the effects of the banked track encircling the venue, upon which other track events in indoor events are run. At outdoor venues it is a rare distance, at least for senior athletes. The format of the event is similar to other sprint distances. The sprinters follow three initial instructions: 'on your marks', instructing them to take up position in the starting blocks; 'set', instructing them to adopt a more efficient starting posture, which also isometrically preloads their muscles. This will enable them to start faster. The final instruction is the firing of the starter's pistol. Upon hearing this the sprinters stride forwards from the blocks.

The 60 metres was an Olympic event in the 1900 and 1904 Summer Games but was removed from the schedule thereafter. American Christian Coleman currently holds the men's world record in the 60 metres with a time of 6.34 seconds, while Russian Irina Privalova holds the women's world record at 6.92.

In the past, it was common for athletes to compete in the 60 yards (54.86 m) race. This is not part of the lineage of the 60 metres, but is the predecessor of the 55 metres race. 60 metres is 65.6168 yards.

60 metres split vs. 60 metres indoor
Traditionally, the 60 m indoor event serves as the equivalent of the 100 m event in preseason, and sprinters do not peak until outdoor season. This is why elite sprinters almost always run a faster 60 m split en route to their 100 m time during outdoor season than their best 60 m indoor time, even after adjusting for wind assistance (wind assistance has lesser impact on shorter distance such as 60 m than on longer distance race). Given that 60 m splits were achieved en route to 100 m performances and the athletes weren't able to lean for the finish at the 60 m mark, elite sprinters could be expected to run even faster 60 m times than their best en route splits if they specifically raced a 60 m race during outdoor season.  

Usain Bolt ran a 6.31 seconds 60 m split, the second fastest split all-time, en route to his 100 m world record, despite never having participated in the 60 m indoor event. Asafa Powell ran a 6.32 seconds split, while clocking only 6.44 seconds in the 60 m indoor event. 2012 Indoor 60 m World Champion Justin Gatlin, who has the personal best of 6.34 for the 60 m split, ran 6.45 seconds indoors. Former indoor world record holder and 1999 Indoor 60 m World Champion Maurice Greene ran a 6.33 split outdoors compared to his 6.39 indoor personal best. The current indoor world record holder Christian Coleman clocked in at 6.32 seconds en route to his 9.76 seconds 100 m personal best, significantly faster than his 6.34 indoor world record which he set at 5,312 feet altitude (equivalent to 6.37 indoor after adjusting for the effect of altitude). 

At the 2020 Tokyo Olympics, en route to his 100 m personal best of 9.83 seconds, Su Bingtian, who has the indoor personal best of 6.42, ran the fastest 60 m split of all-time and the fastest 60 m ever recorded under any conditions with a time of 6.29 seconds.

Area records
Updated 19 March 2022.

All-time top 25
Indoor results only

Men
Updated March 2023.

Note: The following athletes have had their performances annulled due to doping offences:

Outdoor best performances

+ = en route to 100 m mark

Note: The following athletes have had their associated 100 m performances annulled due to doping offences:

Women
Updated March 2023.

Outdoor best performances

+ = en route to 100 m mark

Olympic medalists

World Indoor Championships medalists

Men 

a The event was known as the World Indoor Games in 1985. 
b Ben Johnson of Canada originally won the gold medal, but he was disqualified in 1989 after admitting to steroid use between 1981 and 1988.

Medal table

Women 

a The event was known as the World Indoor Games in 1985. 
b Angella Issajenko of Canada originally won the silver medal, but she was disqualified in 1989 after admitting to steroid use between 1982 and 1988. 
c Zhanna Block originally won the gold medal, but she was disqualified after her results from November 2002 onwards were deleted in 2011 for long-term drug use.

Medal table (at the )

Season's bests

Men

Women

See also
 2020/21 in 60 metres

Notes and references

External links
All-time men's best 60 metres from alltime-athletics.com
All-time women's best 60 metres from alltime-athletics.com

 
Events in track and field
Sprint (running)
Indoor track and field
Discontinued Summer Olympic disciplines in athletics